Gretchen Wynnifer Massey Lukas (born 1969 in Newport News, Virginia) is a Los Angeles-based radio host and performer.  Her CBS Radio talk show 'CrackinUp w/ Gretchen & the Lukes' aired weekly on the Los Angeles station KLSX 97.1 Free FM every 'Fraturday' (their word for Fridays, 11pm-1am pacific). Gretchen had a long run at KLSX as a talk radio host of several different programs over many years up until the station changed to all music format on February 20, 2009.

Massey has a history in entertainment of being an actor, comedian and also as a talk show host. In the past, she was lead host of the nationally syndicated radio talk show "Radio Girls" and was on 97.1 KLSK FM talk radio station in Los Angeles, as co-host of "Lauren & Gretchen Uncut."  Massey had a love of the theatre and performing from an early age, and attended Dallas's Booker T. Washington High School for the Performing and Visual Arts. This love evolved into a long journey of writing and performing through many cities with various theater companies, improvisational theatre groups and then as a stand-up comedian later in her life. She is well known for being one of the various presenters on the Playboy TV television show, Sexcetera.

Big Brother
She was the host of the CBS Big Brother show House Calls: The Big Brother Talk Show that  was broadcast weekdays on cbs.com, when Big Brother USA is in season. House Calls analyzed the goings-on taking place in the Big Brother USA house and game. Gretchen hosted House Calls with Marcellas Reynolds for its first two years. Due to Marcellas being part of season 7's All-Stars, Gretchen was the sole host. Many assumed Marcellas would return to his co-hosting duties, but due to budget cuts he did not return to House Calls for its fourth season (aired during Big Brother 8). House Calls was canceled after season 10.

Gretchen and The Lukes

Crackin-Up with Gretchen and The Lukes can now be heard on HotTalkLA.

She is married to standup comic Mike Lukas (of The Straight Dope fame), her "Gretchen and The Lukes" co-host. "Gretchen and the Lukes" airs on the Los Angeles station KLSX 97.1 Free FM Fridays from 11pm-1am and on San Francisco-based 106.9 Free FM Sundays from 9pm-11pm. Although Gretchen and Lukas do acknowledge being married on air, they are pretending that they are not married to each other for the show, which runs contrary to some Mike Lukas interviews published before the show's debut, mentioning specifically that he just married his longtime girlfriend in her hometown of Dallas, and in addition, Mike Lukas's old personal homepage (miKeluKas.com—offline as of late December 2005) identified Gretchen (in name and photos) as his longtime love.

Gretchen and her husband Mike Lukas live in Ohio and have one child born in 2009.

References

1969 births
Living people
People from Newport News, Virginia
American game show hosts
People from Dallas
American radio personalities